Phyllonorycter kazuri is a moth of the family Gracillariidae. It is found in eastern Kenya where its habitat consists primarily of savannah, at an altitude of about 500 meters.

The forewings of P. kazuri are between 2.1 and 2.2 mm long; in appearance they are golden ochreous with white markings consisting of a short basal streak; two transverse, sharply angulated fasciae; and two costal and one dorsal strigulae. The hindwings are pale beige with a whitish golden fringe. Adults are on wing in mid-April.

P. kazuri is very similar to related species P. encaeria and P. lantanae. It can only be distinguished from the former by the coloration of the thorax and genital construction: whereas in P. encaeria, the thorax is golden ochreous throughout, P. kazuri has white lateral sides. P. kazuri also has flap-like ventral projections of the valva to differentiate it from P. encaeria.

Etymology
The specific epithet means "small and beautiful" in Swahili.

References

Endemic moths of Kenya
Moths described in 2012
kazuri
Moths of Africa

Taxa named by Jurate de Prins